"Talk Up" is a song by Canadian rapper Drake from his album, Scorpion (2018). It features American rapper Jay-Z and additional uncredited vocals by Canadian rapper Baka Not Nice. The song reached the top 20 in Canada and the United States.

Composition
"Talk Up" is a hip hop song that contains samples from N.W.A's song "Dope Man" (1987).

Commercial performance

North America
On July 14, 2018, "Talk Up" entered the charts at number 17 on the Billboard Canadian Hot 100 and remained in the top 100 until July 28, 2018. The song spent eight weeks on the US Billboard Hot 100, entering the charts at number 20, its immediate peak, on July 14, 2018.

Internationally
The song peaked in the top 40 in Australia, Greece, Portugal, Slovakia and has charted on the charts of Austria, Czech Republic, France, Germany, the Netherlands and Sweden.

Charts

References

2018 songs
Drake (musician) songs
Songs written by Drake (musician)
Songs written by Jay-Z
Songs written by DJ Paul
Songs written by Ice Cube
Songs written by Walter Morrison
Songs written by Dr. Dre